Ermin Lepić (known simply as Lepa) is a Bosnian volleyball player, currently playing for OK Sisak, a team in the Croatian Premier Volleyball League Men's Championship ("Superliga") Division, and also an international player for Bosnia and Herzegovina.

Until the end of the 2009–2010 season, Lepić played as setter for OK Kakanj, the Premier League of Volleyball of Bosnia and Herzegovina's most successful volleyball club 1994-2008 and was team captain 2002–2004. In September 2010 he decided not to sign for OK Kakanj again on the terms offered.

While with OK Kakanj he won 6 Championship titles (2000, 2001, 2003, 2004, 2005) and won the National Cup of Bosnia and Herzegovina 9 times (1994, 1995, 1996, 1997, 2001, 2002, 2003, 2004, 2006).

References

External links
 Ermin Lepić photograph, October 2010, kakanjlive.com, 6.10.2010, accessed 26 December 2010

Bosnia and Herzegovina men's volleyball players
1980 births
Living people
Bosniaks of Bosnia and Herzegovina